Belize competed at the 1996 Summer Olympics in Atlanta, United States.

Athletics 

Men
Track & road events

Field events

Women
Track & road events

Field events

Cycling

Road

References
Official Olympic Reports

Nations at the 1996 Summer Olympics
1996
Summer Olympics